Sanicula smallii is a flowering herb of the carrot family, Apiaceae. It is known by the common names Small's blacksnakeroot or southern snakeroot. It is found throughout the southeastern United States.

References

External links

smallii
Flora of the Southeastern United States
Plants described in 1897